Wes Roach (born December 10, 1988) is an American professional golfer.

Roach was born in Knoxville, Tennessee. He played college golf at Duke University. He turned professional after graduating in 2011.

Roach played on the Web.com Tour in 2012 and 2013, finishing 22nd on the money list in 2013 to earn his PGA Tour card for 2014. On the PGA Tour, he made 11 of 22 cuts in 2014 with a best finish of T-4 at the Puerto Rico Open. He finished 153rd on the FedEx Cup points list and lost his PGA Tour card and returned to the Web.com Tour in 2015. He won his first Web.com Tour event at the 2015 El Bosque Mexico Championship.

Professional wins (1)

Web.com Tour wins (1)

Web.com Tour playoff record (0–1)

See also
2013 Web.com Tour Finals graduates
2015 Web.com Tour Finals graduates
2018 Web.com Tour Finals graduates

References

External links

American male golfers
Duke Blue Devils men's golfers
PGA Tour golfers
Korn Ferry Tour graduates
Golfers from Tennessee
1988 births
Living people